Tellis is both a surname and a given name. Notable people with the name include:

Ashley J. Tellis (born 1961), international relations scholar
Gerard Tellis, business professor
Tellis Frank (born 1965), American basketball player
Tellis of Sicyon, Ancient Greek athlete